Pasiphilodes viridescens is a moth in the family Geometridae. It is found in Malaysia, New Guinea and possibly Borneo.

The forewings are green and the hindwings are pale cinereous, with traces of three or four dusky curved fasciae.

Larvae have been recorded feeding on Rhododendron species.

References

Moths described in 1895
Eupitheciini